Segun Toyin Dawodu (born 13 October 1960) is a Nigerian  Physiatrist and lawyer with the WellSpan Health,  he served as  an Associate Professor of Pain Medicine at Albany Medical College.

Dawodu contributed to the peer-reviewed articles on the diagnosis and management of Spinal Cord Injury, Cauda Equina and Conus Medullaris Syndromes, Swallowing Disorders Traumatic Brain Injury, and chapter in Comprehensive Pain Management in the Rehabilitation Patient. In 1998, he established dawodu.com, a website on Nigeria's socio-political issues and one of the earliest blogs in 1997 on Nigeria.

Background 
Dawodu has a  degree in Medicine (MD) from University of Ibadan, Nigeria. He proceeded to University of London for his Law (LL.B and LL.M) and King's College London The Dickson Poon School of Law (LL.M in International Corporate and Commercial Law, as its first graduate for that degree) along with graduation as Associateship of King's College. He did his master's degree in Medical Informatics (Masters of Science) from Northwestern University and also Masters in Business Administration (MBA) from Johns Hopkins University Carey Business School.

He also got a board certification in Physical Medicine and Rehabilitation, Pain Medicine, Sports Medicine, Clinical informatics, Spinal Cord Injury Medicine and Electrodiagnostic Medicine.
He is also a diplomate of the Royal College of Surgeons of Edinburgh, Scotland. From 2000 to 2001, he was a Clinical Instructor of Traumatic Brain Injury and Stroke Medicine at Mount Sinai Hospital/Medical School in New York City.

He served as a pioneer member of the editorial board and author in the KNOWLEDGE NOW which is now called publications of the American Academy of Physical Medicine and Rehabilitation.

Physician 
Dawodu is a licensed Physician in the United States  in New York ,  in the United Kingdom with the General Medical Council, Nigeria with the Medical and Dental Council of Nigeria  and Medical Board of Trinidad and Tobago. He is also a licensed Medical Informatician as a specialist in Medical informatics/ Health informatics with the United Kingdom Council For Health Informatics Professions (UKCHIP).

Fellow and membership 

• Membership of different committees of the American Academy of Neuromuscular and Electrodiagnostic Medicine.

• Fellow of the American Academy of Physical Medicine and Rehabilitation.

• Fellow of the American Academy of Neuromuscular and Electrodiagnostic Medicine.

• Fellow of the Royal Society for Public Health.

• Fellow of the Royal Society of Medicine.

• Fellow of the Faculty or Clinical Informatics UK.

• Member of the Faculty of Medical Leadership and Management.

• Member/Diplomate of the Royal College of Surgeons of Edinburgh.

References

1960 births
Living people
American pain physicians
Nigerian pain physicians
People from Benin City
American rehabilitation physicians
People from Edo State
University of Ibadan alumni
Alumni of the University of London
Alumni of University of London Worldwide
Alumni of King's College London
Alumni of The Dickson Poon School of Law
Johns Hopkins Carey Business School alumni
Northwestern University alumni
Johns Hopkins University alumni
Associates of King's College London
Nigerian human rights activists
Nigerian expatriate academics in the United States
People associated with King's College London
Nigerian bloggers
Nigerian lawyers
21st-century Nigerian lawyers